Interstate 196 (I-196) is an auxiliary Interstate Highway that runs for  in the US state of Michigan. It is a state trunkline highway that links Benton Harbor, South Haven, Holland, and Grand Rapids. In Kent, Ottawa, and Allegan counties, I-196 is known as the Gerald R. Ford Freeway, or simply the Ford Freeway, after President Gerald Ford, who was raised in Grand Rapids and served Michigan in the House of Representatives for 25 years. This name generally refers only to the section between Holland and Grand Rapids. I-196 changes direction; it is signed as a north–south highway from its southern terminus to the junction with US Highway 31 (US 31) just south of Holland, and as an east–west trunkline from this point to its eastern terminus at an interchange with I-96, its parent highway. There are three business routes related to the main freeway. There are two business loops (BL I-196) and one business spur (BS I-196) that serve South Haven, Holland and the Grand Rapids areas. Another business spur for Muskegon had been designated relative to the I-196 number.

The freeway numbered I-196 is the second in the state to bear the number. Originally to be numbered as part of the I-94 corridor in the state, the Benton Harbor–Grand Rapids freeway was given the I-96 number in the 1950s while another Interstate between Muskegon and Grand Rapids was numbered I-196. That I-196 was built in the late 1950s and completed in the early 1960s. The first segment of the current I-196 was opened as I-96 near Benton Harbor in 1962. Michigan officials requested a change in 1963 which reversed the two numbers, and the subsequent segments of freeway opened northward to Holland and from Grand Rapids westward under the current number. The gap between Holland and Grandville was filled in the 1970s, and a section of freeway that runs through downtown Grand Rapids was rebuilt as a wider freeway in 2010.

Route description
Like other state highways in Michigan, I-196 is maintained by the Michigan Department of Transportation (MDOT). In 2011, the department's traffic surveys showed that on average, 77,500 vehicles used the highway daily between Lane Avenue and US 131 in Grand Rapids and 12,778 vehicles did so each day north of the split with US 31 near Holland. These are the highest and lowest counts along the highway, respectively. As an Interstate Highway, all of I-196 is listed on the National Highway System, a network of roads important to the country's economy, defense, and mobility. In addition, the highway has been named by the Michigan Legislature the Gerald R. Ford Freeway to honor the 38th President of the United States. The original legislation from 1974 extended that name to the full length of the freeway, but when the various memorial highway names were re-codified in 2001, the name was not applied to the Berrien County segment. From the junction with M-63 north to the split with US 31 except for the section that connects the ends of the South Haven business loop, the freeway is also a part of the Lake Michigan Circle Tour (LMCT), a tourist route that follows Lake Michigan.

Benton Harbor to Holland
The freeway starts northeast of Benton Harbor at exit 34 on I-94 in Benton Charter Township in Berrien County. At the trumpet interchange, I-196 runs north from I-94 and passes to the west of the Point O'Woods Golf & Country Club. US 31 joins I-196 from the southwest and runs concurrently with I-196 as the freeway passes through farm fields in southwestern Michigan. The trunkline turns northwesterly near the Lake Michigan Hills Golf Course and crosses the Paw Paw River. Past the river, the freeway turns northeasterly and runs roughly parallel to the Lake Michigan shoreline several miles inland. At the community of Lake Michigan Beach, I-196/US 31 meets the northern terminus of M-63 at exit 7, and the LMCT joins the freeway for the first time. North of this interchange, the freeway parallels A-2, a county road that follows the Blue Star Highway, the former route of US 31.

A bit further north, I-196/US 31 crosses into Van Buren County and assumes the Gerald R. Ford Freeway name. The inland side of the freeway is forested while the lakeward side is predominantly either forest or fields. As it approaches South Haven, the freeway passes near the Palisades Nuclear Generating Station and Van Buren State Park. North of the power plant and park, the freeway turns farther inland to bypass the city of South Haven. There is an interchange on the south side of town that provides access to Business Loop I-196 (BL I-196) and M-140. The freeway crosses over M-43 without an interchange and then intersects the other end of the business loop about  later. It crosses the Black River near the Van Buren–Allegan county line.

In Allegan County, I-196/US 31 passes a pair of golf courses and continues northward through farm fields. Near the community of Glenn, A-2 crosses over the freeway and runs parallel to it on the east. They trade places again when I-196/US 31 turns northeasterly on the south side of the twin cities of Saugatuck and Douglas. The freeway crosses over a section of Kalamazoo Lake, a wider section of the Kalamazoo River that flows between the two towns. A-2 crosses back to the eastern side of the freeway north of Saugatuck, and I-196/US 31 continues north-northeasterly toward Holland.

Holland to Grand Rapids
On the south side of Holland, the two highways split apart; US 31 separates from I-196 at a partial interchange near the West Michigan Regional Airport (formerly the Tulip City Airport). At this interchange, northbound traffic may follow a left exit to continue on the BL I-196/US 31 freeway or continue along I-196 which turns more eastward; the LMCT departs I-196 at this point as well. Signage along I-196 changes after this interchange. Up to this point, it had been signed north–south, but from the US 31 split onward, the directions are now signed east–west. The freeway passes to the south side of the airport, and it crosses a rail line owned by CSX Transportation and used by Amtrak's Pere Marquette train before curving northeasterly through the interchange with M-40. The freeway crosses into Ottawa County south of the Macatawa River before meeting the other two interchanges for Holland, the second of which is the northern end of the business loop in Zeeland.

Continuing past Zeeland, I-196 runs more east-northeasterly as it parallels M-121 (Chicago Drive). The freeway passes to the south side of Hudsonville and intersects A-37. About  past Hudsonville, the trunkline has an interchange with M-6, a freeway that runs along the south side of the Grand Rapids area. Just past this interchange, the freeway crosses into Kent County at the Kenowa Avenue overpass. Now in the city of Grandville, I-196 turns northward to run parallel to the county line. The freeway has an interchange for 44th Street, which provides access to the RiverTown Crossings mall and other retail and restaurant establishments in the area. At exit 69, I-196 crosses Chicago Drive and the rail line and turns northeasterly next to Jenison, an unincorporated community opposite the Kent–Ottawa county line. The Ford Freeway name is now prominently used on the freeway signage as I-196 follows a section of the Grand River. Past the interchange for M-11 (28th Street), the freeway crosses into the suburb of Wyoming.

In Wyoming, the freeway runs along the river, passing Millennium Park on the opposite banks in Walker and Hopewell Indian Mounds Park on the near banks. To the south of the freeway, the business spur for Wyoming and Grand Rapids departs to follow Chicago Drive near an industrial area. After the interchange for Market Avenue, I-196 crosses the Grand River and enters the city of Grand Rapids. The freeway meanders northward past the transmission antennas for radio stations WJRW and WYHA and around the west side of the John Ball Zoological Garden. The trunkline has an interchange with M-45 (Lake Michigan Drive) on the north side of the zoo before I-196 runs downhill turning eastward.

At the bottom of the hill, I-196 enters the urban core of Grand Rapids. The freeway runs eastward through residential neighborhoods on the city's west side as it approaches the interchange with US 131. This complex structure is adjacent to the Grand River north of the Gerald R. Ford Presidential Museum. The carriageways for I-196 run through the interchange on different levels, with the eastbound traffic carried down near river level and the westbound lanes above the crisscrossing carriageways of US 131's freeway. I-196 crosses the river on the opposite side of the interchange and both directions return to the same level. The freeway picks up an additional lane at this point as the median is replaced by a concrete barrier.

As the freeway runs eastward, it passes the area of Grand Rapids known as the "Medical Mile", a district anchored by the Van Andel Institute, Helen DeVos Children's Hospital, a campus of the Michigan State University College of Human Medicine and the Butterworth Hospital campus of Spectrum Health. The Ford Freeway jogs slightly to the northeast as it crosses a line of the Grand Rapids Eastern Railroad between College and Eastern avenues. It then passes to the south of the office buildings that house the Kent County Health Department, the Sheriff's Department and the animal shelter. A little over a mile and a quarter (2.0 km) east of those offices, I-196 meets its parent highway, I-96 on the east side of the city. This interchange marks the eastern terminus of the Ford Freeway and I-196.

History

Previous designation

In the first tentative Interstate numbering plans, the freeways in Michigan now numbered I-96 and I-196 were supposed to be part of the I-94 corridor, and the freeway between Muskegon and Grand Rapids was to be I-94N. Later, the initial approvals by the federal government routed I-96 from Benton Harbor north to Grand Rapids and then east to Detroit, and I-196 was the spur route from Grand Rapids to Muskegon. The first segment of freeway built was a relocated section of US 16 near Coopersville and Marne. The freeway opened at the end of 1957 or in early 1958, and the first markers for I-196 were erected in 1959. The full Grand Rapids–Muskegon I-196 freeway was completed and opened to traffic in December 1962, connecting to an I-96 freeway that led east toward Lansing; the US 16 corridor was a continuous freeway with two different Interstate designations. Before the Grand Rapids–Benton Harbor segment was completed, the Michigan State Highway Department (MSHD), predecessor to the modern MDOT, petitioned federal highway officials to switch the Interstate designations west of Grand Rapids. Permission for this switch was granted in 1963, and the signs were changed in January 1964. Consideration was also made to name the Grand Rapids–Benton Harbor freeway I-67. The previously completed I-196 was redesignated as an extension of I-96, and the completed freeway segments southwest of Grand Rapids were redesignated I-196; I-67 was rejected by the American Association of State Highway Officials.

Current designation

In August 1963, a section of freeway along US 31 was opened between I-94 and South Haven. This section was originally designated as part of I-96/US 31. After the designation switch later in 1963, an additional section was opened from South Haven to Holland as I-196. An additional section of freeway was opened between Grandville through downtown Grand Rapids to meet I-96 at the end of 1964. M-21 was moved to the freeway from its previous surface-street routing. The final link in the freeway was completed in November 1974 along the Holland–Grandville segment, completing I-196 for a second time. At the same time, M-21 was removed from the freeway, truncating that highway designation to end in Grand Rapids.

In 2009, access to Jenison was improved by the addition of a partial interchange with Baldwin Street. The section through downtown Grand Rapids east of the Grand River was rebuilt during 2010 in a project MDOT dubbed the "Fix on I-196". The project added a third travel lane in each direction with weave-merge lanes between interchanges and rebuilt several of the overpasses in the area. In 2016, the sections of I-196 that run concurrently with US 31 north of the M-63 interchange, except between the ends of the business loop at South Haven were designated as part of the West Michigan Pike Pure Michigan Byway.

Exit list

Business routes
There are currently three business loops (BL I-196) and one business spur (BS I-196) along I-196. A BS I-196 in Muskegon was designated along what is now Bus. US 31 before the Muskegon–Grand Rapids freeway was redesignated I-96.

South Haven

The loop begins at exit 18 on I-196/US 31 and runs due north along La Grange Street. It then turns onto Phillips Street and merges into Broadway Street. BL I-196 follows Phoenix Street eastward where the trunkline ends at exit 20 on I-196. The entire length is a part of the LMCT. A bypass of downtown was built during World War II; the former route of US 31 through downtown was designated Bus. US 31 at that time. When I-196 was built outside of South Haven in 1963, the former US 31 bypass was redesignated BL I-196. In 1972, the loop was shifted to follow the pre-war routing through downtown. In 2016, all of the business loop was designated as part of the West Michigan Pike Pure Michigan Byway.

Major intersections

Holland

The loop starts at a connection with I-196/US 31 at exit 44 and continues concurrently along the freeway into Holland. BL I-196/US 31 has an interchange for A-2 (Blue Star Highway) and Washington Avenue before the freeway ends in the southern reaches of Holland. The trunkline then runs as a divided highway northward, bypassing downtown Holland to the east and intersecting M-40. Northeast of downtown, BL I-196 leaves US 31 and the LMCT at an interchange to follow an expressway along the route of Chicago Drive. The loop follows this expressway through Zeeland and back out to I-196 at exit 55.

The loop was created in 1974 when I-196 was completed south of the city of Holland. From that point, the old route of M-21 inside the cities to US 31 was redesignated as a business loop of I-196 with the state taking control of Washington Avenue to the downtown area. Then from downtown looping back up to Chicago Drive, the business loop used the old M-21. Along Washington Avenue and Chicago Drive between junctions with US 31, the highway bore a concurrent Bus. US 31 designation. The concurrent trunkline inside the downtown area of Holland was transferred to the City of Holland in 2005, and BL I-196 was rerouted to follow US 31. In 2016, the section of the business loop that runs concurrently with US 31 was designated as part of the West Michigan Pike Pure Michigan Byway.

Major intersections

Wyoming

Business Spur I-196 (BS I-196) is a spur that serves the Godfrey–Lee area of Wyoming, Michigan. It starts at the partial interchange for exit 72 on I-196 and then moves onto the surface street Chicago Drive for the majority of the distance in Wyoming, running through an industrial area. After about a mile (1.6 km), the highway runs through residential areas. Upon reaching the Grand Rapids city limits, it ends at Cesar E Chavez Avenue. It can be accessed only from eastbound I-196 on the western end.

In 1953, the state highway department completed enough of the Grand Rapids beltline to reroute M-21 to it. The former routing of M-21 was then redesignated Bus. M-21. With the completion of I-196 from Holland to Grand Rapids in 1974, the highway was truncated to run between I-196 and US 131 and renamed BS I-196. In December 2017, it was shortened further to end at the Grand Rapids city limits at the intersection between Chicago Drive and Clyde Park Avenue when the remainder of the trunkline along Grandville Avenue and Franklin Street was turned over to local control.

Major intersections

See also

Notes

References

External links

Mainline

I-196 at Michigan Highways
I-196 Michigan at AARoad's Interstate Guide
3-digit Interstates from I-96 at Kurumi.com
Business routes

BL I-196 in South Haven at Michigan Highways

BL I-196 in Holland at Michigan Highways

BS I-196 in Grand Rapids at Michigan Highways

96-1
96-1
1
U.S. Route 31
Lake Michigan Circle Tour
Transportation in Berrien County, Michigan
Transportation in Van Buren County, Michigan
Transportation in Allegan County, Michigan
Transportation in Ottawa County, Michigan
Transportation in Kent County, Michigan